Wiel Coerver (3 December 1924 – 22 April 2011) was a Dutch football manager and the developer of the "Coerver Method", a football coaching technique.

Playing career
Coerver played five years for local side Rapid JC, with whom he won the Dutch league title in 1956.

Managerial career
After retiring as a player, he managed Dutch clubs  S.V.N., Rapid JC, Sparta,  N.E.C., Feyenoord and Go Ahead Eagles as well as Indonesia. He won the UEFA Cup with Feyenoord Rotterdam in the 1973–1974 season as well as the Eredivisie title.

Coerver Method
The Coerver Method is a football coaching technique which Coerver created. By analysing videotapes of various great players including Pelé, he devised a new concept in football which advocates that skill could not only be inherent with the young players but could also be passed on in a comprehensive academic way. Under this technique, players progress in a structured manner, pyramidal, from basics of ball mastery to a tactically driven group attack. They would be exposed to the other essentials like Receiving and Passing, Moves (1v1), Speed and Lethal Finishing. 

The 1998 FIFA World Cup in France saw the first Coerver student, Boudewijn Zenden who played for the Dutch national team, make it to the FIFA World Cup.

Personal life
Coerver, who was born in Kerkrade, was nicknamed the "Albert Einstein of Football". He died of pneumonia in April 2011 in Kerkrade.

Honours
Feyenoord 
Eredivisie: 1973–74
UEFA Cup: 1973–74

See also
 List of UEFA Cup winning managers

References

External links

Coerver.com
Coerver Belgium
Coerver Deutschland

1924 births
2011 deaths
Sportspeople from Kerkrade
Dutch footballers
Roda JC Kerkrade players
Dutch football managers
Eredivisie managers
Feyenoord managers
Go Ahead Eagles managers
NEC Nijmegen managers
Roda JC Kerkrade managers
Sparta Rotterdam managers
UEFA Cup winning managers
Indonesia national football team managers
Dutch expatriate football managers
Expatriate football managers in Indonesia
Deaths from pneumonia in the Netherlands
Association football forwards
Rinus Michels Award winners
Dutch expatriate sportspeople in Indonesia
Footballers from Limburg (Netherlands)